Hobbs High School (HHS) is located in Hobbs, New Mexico, United States. It had a student population of about 1900 students as of 2017.

In addition to Hobbs it serves Monument, Nadine, and North Hobbs.

Ralph Tasker coached basketball at HHS for 49 years, from 1949 to 1998.

Campus

The school has a fairly standard indoor campus with several classrooms that can be entered from the outside. It also has a new auditorium and athletic center.

Until May 2002, Hobbs freshmen went to one of three junior high schools: Highland, Houston, or Heizer.  All three housed 7th through 9th grade. The decision was made to convert Heizer Junior High School into a freshman high school to help transition 9th grade students into high school curriculum and behavioral expectations. Heizer was chosen because of its ability to expand, being surrounded by an open field.  Both Highland and Houston were surrounded by housing and other problems that would have prevented expansions.

Until the summer of 2011, the freshmen were either bussed or otherwise transported to the campus, which angered many parents because of its location in the extreme southern location of Hobbs.  After a few years of discussion, the Hobbs Municipal Schools Board of Education decided that the best way to transition the freshmen to high school would be to build what would be known as the Hobbs Freshman High School (HFHS) next to the existing high school.  The first freshman class at the new school entered in August 2011. Heizer, meanwhile, returned to being a junior high school.

Mascot and colors
Hobbs High School's mascot is the Eagle, and the colors are primarily black and gold, with white being a secondary color.  One of the more prominent features of the campus is the eagle on a globe statue outside the front of the campus, facing Jefferson Street.  Over the years, students from rival high schools have repeatedly painted this statue in their own colors as a prank.

Athletics

HHS competes in the New Mexico Activities Association (NMAA), as a class 6A school in District 3. In 2015, the NMAA realigned the state's schools in to six classifications and adjusted district boundaries for the 2016-2017 and 2017-2018 school years.  In addition to Hobbs High School, the schools in District 3-6A include Las Cruces High School,  Mayfield High School, Oñate High School, Centennial High School, Gadsden High School, and Carlsbad High School.

Hobbs High School has a total of 60 state titles  and competes in sports as the Eagles and Lady Eagles, which include:

 Eagle tennis
 Lady Eagle volleyball 
 The football team has won two state titles. The Eagles play their home games at Watson Memorial Stadium. Players wear a variety of jerseys both at home and on the road, with black and gold being worn at home and white being used for road games. The Eagles have white helmets with an "H" logo and a stylized eagle on the inside.
 The basketball team has won 17 state championships. 
 Eagle baseball and softball 
 Eagle cross country. The Eagles have won back-to-back state championships as a team and as an individual.
 Swimming and diving team
 Eagle wrestling

State Championships

Boys
Football (2): 1970, 1972
Soccer (1): 1997
Basketball (17): 1956, 1957, 1958, 1966, 1968, 1969, 1970, 1980, 1981, 1987, 1988, 1999, 2000, 2001, 2002, 2008, 2015
Golf (7): 1957, 1961, 1970, 1987, 1988, 2012, 2021 
Track and field (11): 1938, 1939, 1965, 1966, 1972, 1973, 1974, 1980, 1983, 1984, 1992
Cross country (3): 1965, 2015, 2016

Girls
Basketball (3): , 2003, 2018, 2020
Softball (1): 1986
Tennis (3):1999, 2000, 2001
Track and field (5): 1975, 1978, 1981, 1989, 1997

Co-ed
Cheer (1): 2019

Notable alumni

 Bill Bridges, NBA player
 Tharon Drake, swimmer, US Paralympic medalist 2016
 Brandon Harper, MLB player (Washington Nationals)
 Aubrey Linne, NFL and CFL player
 Elmore Morgenthaler, professional basketball player
 Larry Robinson, standout college basketball player
 Timmy Smith, Washington Redskins player; holds Super Bowl record for most rushing yards (208)
 Jeff Taylor, NBA player: Houston Rockets (1982 - 1983), Detroit Pistons (1986 - 1987)
 Jeffery Taylor, son of Jeff Taylor, NBA player: Charlotte Bobcats/Hornets (2012 - 2015)
 Guy Penrod, gospel music singer

References

External links
 Hobbs Schools

Public high schools in New Mexico
Schools in Lea County, New Mexico